The Allegheny Highlands forests are a temperate broadleaf and mixed forests ecoregion of North America, as defined by the World Wildlife Fund. The United States EPA defines the area as belonging to the Northern Central Appalachians and Northern Appalachain Plateau and Uplands ecoregions.

Setting
The ecoregion consists of four separate blocks of mixed forest surrounded by lower lying areas of hardwood forest as follows: the Northern Allegheny Plateau in New York State and Pennsylvania including the Catskill Mountains, the Poconos, the Finger Lakes and French Creek areas; areas of the north and central Appalachians; the western Allegheny Plateau in western Pennsylvania and Ohio; and the upland plain around Lake Erie and Lake Ontario.

Climate
The North Central Appalachians ecoregion has a severe mid-latitude humid continental climate, marked by warm summers and snowy, cold winters. The mean annual temperature ranges from roughly 3°C to 8°C with an average of 1082 mm annual precipitation. The Northern Appalachian Plateau and Highlands ecoregion, also a severe mid-latitude humid continental climate, has a mean annual temperature of 7°C, seeing an average of 969 mm of precipitation.

Flora
Most of this forest was cleared in the late-19th and early-20th centuries. Although all individual trees species still remain, their quantities and distribution are radically different from the forest's original state. The Finger Lakes area has a particularly rich mixture of woodland, while the pinewoods in the Pocono Mountains are a unique habitat.

Upland hardwood forests include red maple (Acer rubrum), American beech (Fagus grandifolia), black cherry (Prunus serotina), and black birch (Betula lenta).  

Allegheny hardwood forests consist of black cherry, white ash (Fraxinus americana), and tulip poplar (Liriodendron tulipifera).

Mixed-oak forests of northern red oak (Quercus rubra), white oak (Quercus alba), eastern black oak (Quercus velutina), and scarlet oak (Quercus coccinea) grow along major river drainages and on steep, drier slopes.

Northern hardwood forests include sugar maple (Acer saccharum) and American beech. Also common are yellow birch (Betula alleghaniensis), eastern hemlock (Tsuga canadensis), red maple, black cherry, and eastern white pine (Pinus strobus). Hemlock tends to follow stream drainages, while white pine prefers drier ridgetops. White ash, American elm (Ulmus americana), basswood (Tilia americana), and hop hornbeam (Ostrya virginiana) can occur locally.

Boreal forests occur at high elevations, particularly on the peaks of the Catskill Mountains. These forests include balsam fir (Abies balsamea), paper birch (Betula papyrifera), mountain ash (Sorbus americana), and red cherry (Prunus pensylvanica). Wild raisin (Viburnum cassinoides) and mountain holly (Ilex mucronata) are shrubs that grow in high elevation swamps, bogs, and ledgetops.

Fauna
Wildlife of the forest includes bobcat, American black bear, red fox, gray fox, coyote, porcupine, beaver, groundhog, river otter, raccoon, muskrat, Virginia opossum, snowshoe hare, elk, cottontail rabbit, Allegheny woodrat, white-tailed deer, striped skunk, big brown bat, chipmunk, fox squirrel, gray squirrel, northern and southern flying squirrel, snapping turtle and timber rattlesnake. Birds include American robin, blue jay, northern cardinal, bald eagle, red-tailed hawk, barred owl, great horned owl, northern mockingbird, pileated woodpecker, mallard, great blue heron, Canada goose, belted kingfisher, ruffed grouse, and wild turkey.

Threats and preservation
As well as logging and clearance for farmland another factor that affects the make-up of the forest is grazing, especially by deer, while suburban and tourist development is resulting in more habitat loss in the Catskills and the Finger Lakes especially. Protected areas include Allegheny National Forest, Sproul State Forest, Susquehannock State Forest, Cook Forest State Park, Hammersley Wild Area, and Woodbourne Forest and Wildlife Preserve in Pennsylvania, and Allegany State Park, Catskill Park, Bergen-Byron Swamp and the shores of Hemlock Lake and Canadice Lakes in New York.

See also
 List of ecoregions in the United States (WWF)
 List of ecoregions in the United States (EPA)

References

External links

Catskill Flora Project

Appalachian forests
Temperate broadleaf and mixed forests in the United States
Ecoregions of the United States
Ecoregions of Canada

Plant communities of New York (state)
Plant communities of Ohio
Plant communities of Pennsylvania
Allegheny Plateau
Catskills

Nearctic ecoregions